Neurothemis stigmatizans, known as the painted grasshawk, is an Australian species of dragonfly in the family Libellulidae.
The genus Neurothemis is distributed from India to the western Pacific. This species is found in northern Australia in an arc from the southern Queensland border to Broome, Western Australia.

Neurothemis stigmatizans is a medium sized dragonfly (wingspan 60-85mm) which inhabits still waters in the vicinity of grassy areas. The male abdomen is reddish-brown with a lighter dorsal stripe, his wings have deep reddish-brown markings that extend past the nodus, with paler contrasting veins. The female is pale greenish-yellow with a dark dorsal stripe and side stripe; her wings are mostly hyaline with a dark smudge beyond the nodus and dark wingtips. The pterostigma of both sexes is pink or pale coloured.

Gallery

References

External links

 Catalog of Life
 IUCN redlist search

Libellulidae
Odonata of Oceania
Odonata of Australia
Insects of Australia
Taxa named by Johan Christian Fabricius
Insects described in 1775